Lacey O'Neal (born March 30, 1944) is an American hurdler. She competed in the women's 80 metres hurdles at the 1964 Summer Olympics.

References

External links
 

1944 births
Living people
Athletes (track and field) at the 1964 Summer Olympics
Athletes (track and field) at the 1972 Summer Olympics
American female hurdlers
Olympic track and field athletes of the United States
Track and field athletes from Chicago
21st-century American women